The 1981 Bulgarian Cup Final was the 41st final of the Bulgarian Cup (in this period the tournament was named Cup of the Soviet Army), and was contested between Botev Plovdiv and Pirin Blagoevgrad on 5 May 1981 at Vasil Levski National Stadium in Sofia. This was Botev's sixth appearance in a final to Pirin's first. Botev won the final 1–0 with a goal from Mitko Argirov to win the cup for the second time, the first having come in 1962.

Match

Details

See also
1980–81 A Group

References

Bulgarian Cup finals
Botev Plovdiv matches
OFC Pirin Blagoevgrad matches
Cup Final